This is a list of business schools in Utah. Business schools are listed in alphabetical order by name. Schools named after people are alphabetized by last name. The AACSB International―The Association to Advance Collegiate Schools of Business is the oldest, largest, and most respected of the accreditation boards for business schools.

 
Business schools in Utah
Utah
business schools